Mohamed Salem Al-Tunaiji (born 6 October 1969) is an Emirati middle-distance runner. He competed in the men's 800 metres at the 1992 Summer Olympics.

References

1969 births
Living people
Athletes (track and field) at the 1992 Summer Olympics
Emirati male middle-distance runners
Olympic athletes of the United Arab Emirates
Place of birth missing (living people)